In telecommunication, an automatic redial is a service feature that allows the user to dial, by depressing a single key or a few keys, the most recent telephone number dialed at that instrument.

Note: Automatic redial is often associated with the telephone instrument, but may be provided by a PBX, or by the central office. Synonym last number redial. Contrast with automatic calling unit.

Often one must subscribe to a caller ID for use of this function on a landline.

References 

Calling features
Telecommunications